Anastasia or Anastasiia Vitalyevna Gubanova (Georgian: ანასტასია გუბანოვა, ; born 2 December 2002), is a Russian-Georgian figure skater who represents Georgia in women's singles. She is the 2023 European champion, the 2021 CS Golden Spin of Zagreb champion and the 2022 CS Finlandia Trophy bronze medalist. 

Competing for Russia, she is the 2018 CS Golden Spin of Zagreb silver medalist. On the junior level, she is the 2016 Junior Grand Prix Final silver medalist, the 2016 JGP Czech Republic champion, and the 2016 JGP Germany champion.

Personal life 
Gubanova was born on 2 December 2002 in Tolyatti, Samara Oblast, Russia. She confirmed that she had Georgian citizenship in 2021.

Career

Early years 
Gubanova started learning to skate in 2006. She began appearing internationally in the advanced novice category in November 2013, taking gold at the Warsaw Cup. In the following years, she won the Rooster Cup, Gardena Spring Trophy, and NRW Trophy.

2016–17 season: Junior international debut 
Gubanova's junior international debut came at the 2016–17 ISU Junior Grand Prix (JGP) competition in Ostrava, Czech Republic; she won the gold medal by a margin of 0.08 over Japan's Rika Kihira, after placing second in the short program and first in the free skate. At the JGP in Dresden, Germany, she ranked first in both segments and outscored the silver medalist, Yuna Shiraiwa, by 17.91 points. Gubanova qualified for the JGP Final in Marseille, France, where she won the silver medal scoring a new personal best in free skate of 133.77 and with a total of 194.07 points, just behind teammate Alina Zagitova who won the gold medal respectively.

At the 2017 Russian Championships, she placed seventh both on the senior level and at the junior event.

2017–18 season 
At the 2018 Russian Championships, Gubanova placed sixth on the senior level and fourth at the junior event. During the season she won two international junior events, 2017 Cup of Nice and 2017 Tallinn Trophy.

2018–19 season: Senior international debut 
In late November, Gubanova made her senior international debut at the 2018 CS Tallinn Trophy where she finished fourth. One week later she competed at 2018 CS Golden Spin of Zagreb where she won her first international senior and Challenger Series medal (silver) with a personal best score of 198.65 points.

2019–20 season & 2020–21 seasons 
Gubanova placed tenth at the 2020 Russian Championships. She did not compete during the 2020–21 season, and in August of 2021, it was announced that she would continue her career competing for Georgia.

2021–22 season: Debut for Georgia 
Gubanova opened the 2021–22 season at the 2021 CS Finlandia Trophy, her first international assignment since 2018. She placed fourth in the short program, scoring just shy of her personal best, but fell to seventh in the free skate and fifth overall, despite setting new personal bests for both the free program and total score. She was initially scheduled to compete next at the 2021 CS Cup of Austria in November, but withdrew from the event after contracting COVID-19.

After recovering from illness, Gubanova returned to competition in December at the 2021 CS Golden Spin of Zagreb where she earned her first international senior title. She won the short program despite a mistake on her final spin but fell to third in the free program. However, her lead from the short was enough to keep her narrowly in the lead, and she took the gold medal ahead of American skater Amber Glenn and Estonian Niina Petrõkina. She stated in an interview after the event with Russian media outlet Sports.ru, "I'm not in full shape after the illness, the COVID damaged my lungs and respiratory system...but of course, I'm very happy that I got the gold medal here, even if it's not quite ideal yet."

Making her debut at the European Championships in Tallinn, Gubanova placed sixth in the short program with a clean skate. She struggled in the free skate, making several errors and dropping to seventh overall. Despite this, she said that the "impressions, however, are amazing after such a competition. It’s a huge experience for me and for my future career."

Gubanova was officially named to the Georgian team for the 2022 Winter Olympics by the Georgian Figure Skating Federation on 19 January. She began the Olympics on 5 February as the women's entry for Georgia in the team event, where she skated a clean program to place fourth in the segment, and earn 7 points towards Team Georgia's combined score. However, despite scoring 22 team points overall to tie for fifth place with Team China going into the free skate, Team Georgia lost the tie-breaker and did not advance. In the women's event, Gubanova was tenth in the short program. She was tenth in the free skate as well but finished eleventh overall. 

At 2022 World Championships, the field was noticeably affected by the banning of all Russian skaters as a result of the Russo-Ukrainian War. In his more open contest, Gubanova placed sixth.

2022–23 season: European champion 
Gubanova began the new season at the 2022 CS Finlandia Trophy, where she won the bronze medal, finishing 7.95 points behind South Korean silver medalist Kim Chae-yeon. She was then invited to make her senior Grand Prix debut at the 2022 MK John Wilson Trophy. She finished third in the short program and, while fifth in the free skate, remained third overall and won the bronze medal. She said she was "very pleased with my performance today and very happy to be here and glad I could do my job. I'm happy that my work has paid off!" Gubanova then finished seventh at the 2022 Grand Prix of Espoo.

Entering the 2023 European Championships as a podium contender, Gubanova unexpectedly placed first in the short program after pre-event favourite Loena Hendrickx of Belgium made a jump error. Hendrickx fell twice in the free skate, while Gubanova made only a minor jump error, finishing first in that segment as well and taking the gold medal. This was the first ISU championship title for a Georgian skater. She said that "at the end of my performance, there were a lot of emotions. Mostly I was happy that I was able to overcome myself. This medal means a lot to me."

Records and achievements

Historical world record scores
Note: Because of the introduction of the new +5 / -5 GOE (Grade of Execution) system which replaced the previous +3 / -3 GOE system, ISU has decided that all statistics start from zero for the season 2018–19. All previous records are now historical.

 Gubanova was the first junior woman to achieve a free program score above the 130 mark.

Programs

Competitive highlights 
CS: Challenger Series; JGP: Junior Grand Prix

For Georgia

For Russia

Detailed results

Senior level 

Personal best highlighted in bold.

For Georgia

For Russia

Junior level 

Previous ISU world best highlighted in bold. Personal best highlighted in bold.

References

External links 
 
 

! colspan="3" style="border-top: 5px solid #78FF78;" |Historical World Junior Record Holders (before season 2018–19)

2002 births
Living people
Sportspeople from Tolyatti
Russian female single skaters
Female single skaters from Georgia (country)
Russian emigrants to Georgia (country)
Figure skaters at the 2022 Winter Olympics
Olympic figure skaters of Georgia (country)